The 1983 World Team Classic sponsored by State Express was a team snooker tournament played at the Hexagon Theatre in Reading. All matches including the final were played in the best of six matches with a tie break frame between the captains if it stayed 3-3. England regained the title beating Wales 4–2.

The highest break of the tournament was 108, by Cliff Thorburn.


Main draw

Teams

Group A

Group B

Semi-finals

Final

References

World Cup (snooker)
1983 in snooker